Hawk Island is an island in Delaware County, New York. It is located north of East Branch, on the East Branch Delaware River. The east end of the island is located next to the confluence of the Beaver Kill and the West Branch Delaware River.

References

River islands of New York (state)
Landforms of Delaware County, New York
Islands of the Delaware River